Norell is a surname. Notable people with the surname include:

Arne Norell (1917–1971), Swedish furniture designer
Ingeborg Norell (born 1727), the first Finnish female to have received an official decoration
Mark Norell (born 1957), American paleontologist and molecular geneticist
Michael Norell (born 1937), American screenwriter/actor and Executive Producer
Norman Norell (1900–1972), American fashion designer
Ola Norell or Ola Rapace (born 1971), Swedish actor
Paul Norell (born 1952), English actor residing in New Zealand

See also
Norell Oson Bard, a Swedish songwriting and production trio made up of Tim Norell, Ola Håkansson and Alexander Bard
Nordell
Norvell (disambiguation)
Norvelle (disambiguation)
Norwell (disambiguation)